Jan Kazimierz Adamiak (born 11 May 1948) is a Polish agronomist, cathedratic and politician from the Polish People's Party. He served as member of the Senate of Poland from 1993 to 1997.

References

1948 births
Living people
People from Krasnystaw
Polish People's Party politicians
Members of the Senate of Poland 1993–1997
University of Warmia and Mazury in Olsztyn alumni
Recipients of the Order of Polonia Restituta